The 22913 / 22914 Bandra Terminus - Saharsa Humsafar Express is an Humsafar Express train belonging to Western Railway zone that runs between Bandra Terminus and Saharsa Junction. It is currently being operated with 22913/22914 train numbers on a weekly basis. This train was previously running only up to Patna Junction but recently this train has been extended up to Saharsa Junction by the Ministry of Railways.

Coach Composition 

The trains is completely 3-tier AC sleeper trains designed by Indian Railways with features of LED screen display to show information about stations, train speed etc. and will have announcement system as well, Vending machines for tea, coffee and milk, Bio toilets in compartments as well as CCTV cameras.

Service

The 22913/Bandra Terminus - Saharsa Humsafar Express has an average speed of 55 km/hr, and covers 2060 km in 39h 00m.

The 22914/Saharsa - Bandra Terminus Humsafar Express has an average speed of 57 km/hr, and covers 2060 km in 38h 50m.

Route & Halts 

 
 
 
 
 
 
 
 
 
 
 
 
 
 New Barauni Junction

Direction Reversal 

Train reverses its direction 1 times:

Rake Sharing

The train shares its rake with 19043/19044 Bandra Terminus - Bhagat Ki Kothi Humsafar Express.

Traction

Both trains are hauled by a Vadodara Electric Loco Shed based WAP 5 locomotive from end to end

See also 

 Humsafar Express
 Bandra Terminus railway station
 Saharsa Junction railway station

Notes

References

External links 

 22913/Bandra Terminus - Saharsa Humsafar Express
 22914/Saharsa - Bandra Terminus Humsafar Express

Humsafar Express trains
Rail transport in Jharkhand
Rail transport in Maharashtra
Rail transport in Odisha
Rail transport in Chhattisgarh
Transport in Mumbai
Transport in Patna
Railway services introduced in 2017